Fennagh, local name Fenagh is a village in County Carlow, Ireland. It lies on the R724 regional road between Bagenalstown (Muine Bheag) and Myshall.

Amenities
Fenagh village contains two public houses, The Hunter's Rest or "Joe's" and Kearney's, two shops, The Black Cat and Kearney's, a church, a community hall, and a creche.

Sport
The local Gaelic football club, Fenagh GAA (Fiodhnach CLG in Irish) has teams from under 8s up to Senior level. The club, nicknamed the "Moll Bennetts", has won three Carlow Intermediate Football Championships and plays at J.J. Hogan Memorial Park.

People
Richie Kavanagh - entertainer

See also
 List of towns and villages in Ireland

References

Towns and villages in County Carlow